Canción Animal (Spanish for Animal Song) is the fifth album released by the Argentine rock band Soda Stereo, released in September 1990 (see 1990 in music). Many of the songs on the album are among the band's most popular, such as one of their biggest hits "De Música Ligera", the last song played in Soda Stereo's last concert in 1997, "Hombre al agua", "Un Millón de Años Luz", "Te para tres" and others.  It is considered one of the best and most influential albums in the history of Latin American rock music. Many regard it as the best album to ever come out of South America. In 2007, the Argentine edition of Rolling Stone ranked it 9 on its list of "The 100 Greatest Albums of National Rock". The album sold 500,000 copies in Argentina alone.

Track listing

Chart performance

Personnel 
Soda Stereo
 Gustavo Cerati – Lead vocals, guitars
 Zeta Bosio – bass guitar, backing vocals
 Charly Alberti – drums, percussion

Additional personnel
 Alfredo Lois – art direction
 Mariano Lopez – engineer / mixing
 Pedro Aznar – vocal arrangement
 Daniel Melero - Keyboards and arrangements
 Tweety González - Keyboards
 Andrea Álvarez - Percussion
 Peter Baleani – production coordination
 Roger Hughes – assistant engineer
 Vanessa Eckstem - assistant
 Adrian Taverna - Band assistant
 Caito Lorenzo & Alfredo Lois - Photography

External links 
Lyrics
Coveralia - Cancion Animal (album)
Rate your music - Cancion animal by Soda Stereo
CDUniverse - Soda Stereo, Cancion Animal CD Album

References 

Soda Stereo albums
1990 albums
Spanish-language albums
Sony Music Argentina albums